Let's Sing and Dance, formerly known as Let's Dance, is a British television programme shown on BBC One, featuring celebrities performing famous dance routines to raise money for the charities Comic Relief and Sport Relief. The programme was presented by Steve Jones and Alex Jones, who replaced previous host Claudia Winkleman in 2011. In the first series, Anton du Beke was a regular judge, appearing alongside two guest panellists, but in the second series onwards, three guest judges were on the panel each week.

The first series aired between 21 February and 14 March 2009 and was won by Robert Webb. It raised over £300,000 for Comic Relief. The second series, in aid of Sport Relief, aired from 20 February 2010 until 14 March and was won by Rufus Hound. The third series aired between 19 February 2011 and 12 March in aid of Comic Relief, and was won by James Thornton and Charlie Baker. A fourth series aired from 18 February until 17 March 2012 in aid of Sport Relief, and was won by Rowland Rivron. The fifth ran from 16 February 2013 until 9 March 2013, and was won by Antony Cotton. The series' finale was the last Saturday night show to be broadcast live from BBC Television Centre.

On 6 October 2016, the BBC announced that the show would return for Red Nose Day 2017 as Let's Sing and Dance for Comic Relief. On 28 October 2016, it was announced that Mel Giedroyc and Sue Perkins would host the show.

Format
The four-part series was announced by the BBC in January 2009 as part of the corporation's events surrounding Red Nose Day 2009, hosted by Steve Jones and Claudia Winkleman. For the first three programmes, six celebrity acts each recreated a famous dance routine. Viewers then voted for their favourite performer, with the proceeds from their calls going to Comic Relief/Sport Relief. The act with the most viewer votes went through to the final, and the three panellists chose a second act from the top three to go through. The top six acts then returned for the final.

In 2011, Winkleman was replaced by The One Show host Alex Jones.

Episode guide

Series 1 (2009)

Heat 1 (21 February)
The guest panellists the first week were Emma Bunton and Michael McIntyre. The programme also premièred the video for the charity single "Islands in the Stream" released by Gavin & Stacey actors Ruth Jones and Rob Brydon and featuring Tom Jones. The acts were, in order of performance:

EastEnders consisted of Cliff Parisi and John Partridge
The Chefs consisted of Sophie Grigson, Nancy Lam, Sophie Michel, Reza Mohammad, John Burton Race, Paul Rankin, Silvena Rowe, Tony Tobin and Kevin Woodford

Heat 2 (28 February)
The guest panellists for the second week were Jamelia and Paul O'Grady. The acts were, in order of performance:

 Hollyoaks consisted of Loui Batley, Nathalie Emmanuel, Garnon Davies, Dominique Jackson and Ricky Whittle
 The Dragons consisted of Duncan Bannatyne, Peter Jones and Deborah Meaden
 Blue Peter consisted of Mark Curry, Peter Duncan, Janet Ellis, Diane-Louise Jordan, Helen Skelton, Anthea Turner and Tim Vincent

Heat 3 (7 March)
The guest panellists for the third week were Lisa Snowdon and Dara Ó Briain. The acts were, in order of performance:

 At the end of her performance, Britton was joined by husband Phil Vickery
 The Bill consisted of Patrick Robinson and Lisa Maxwell

Final (14 March)
The guest panellists for the final week were Denise van Outen and Michael McIntyre. Ruth Jones, Rob Brydon and Tom Jones performed their charity single "Islands in the Stream", Alesha Dixon performed "Let's Get Excited" and the cast of Hairspray performed "You Can't Stop the Beat". Two acts from each heat returned for the final, and they were, in order of performance:

Series 2 (2010)
In November 2009 it was confirmed on that the show would return but this time in aid of Sport Relief. Winkleman and Jones returned to host the show which kicked off on Saturday 20 February 2010. The contestants were to be judged by an all-new panel that saw the judging line-up change for all four shows (a format that would remain for the next two series).

Heat 1 (20 February)
Panellists: Frank Skinner, Kimberley Walsh and Jason Manford
Performances:
Sugababes – "Wear My Kiss"
JLS – "One Shot"

 Olympians consisted of Dalton Grant, Iwan Thomas, Mark Foster, Leon Taylor, Heather Fell and Jamie Baulch
 Snooker was represented by Dennis Taylor and Willie Thorne, and darts was represented by Bobby George and Tony O'Shea
 Newsreaders consisted of Ellie Crisell, Louise Minchin and Matt Barbet
Casualty was represented by Charles Dale (Big Mac), Tony Marshall (Noel Garcia) and Ben Turner (Jay Faldren)
Holby City was represented by Rosie Marcel (Jac Naylor) and Luke Roberts (Joseph Byrne)

Heat 2 (27 February)
Panellists: Miranda Hart, Paddy McGuinness and Kelly Brook
Performances
 Priscilla Queen of the Desert
 Gabriella Cilmi – "On A Mission"

 Boxers consisted of Carl Froch, Johnny Nelson, Tony Jeffries and Duke McKenzie
 The Weather Girls consisted of Lara Lewington, Clare Nasir and Becky Mantin accompanied by Michael Fish

Heat 3 (6 March)
Panellists: Denise Van Outen, Vic Reeves and Jo Brand
Performances:
Justin Bieber – "Baby"
Cast of Chicago – "All That Jazz"

 The Bill consisted of Sally Rogers and Chris Simmons
 The Grumpy Old Women consisted of Jenny Eclair, Linda Robson, Susie Blake and Lesley Joseph
 Bellamy's People consisted of Felix Dexter, Lucy Montgomery and Rhys Thomas
 The Footballers consisted of Peter Shilton and Jason Cundy

Final (13 March)
Panellists: Robert Webb, Jon Culshaw and Jack Dee
Performances: N-Dubz and the cast of Billy Elliot

Cheryl Fergison injured her leg in rehearsals and was unable to perform. However, she remained in the competition, having her previous performance shown instead.

Series 3 (2011)
On 26 January 2011 it was confirmed the show was returning for another series. Steve Jones hosted the show along with The One Show's Alex Jones. It ran from 19 February until the final on 12 March, when Charlie Baker and James Thornton were crowned champions with their rendition of "Puttin' On The Ritz".

Heat 1 (19 February)
Panellists: Graham Norton, Frank Skinner and Greg Davies
Performances:
JLS – "Eyes Wide Shut"
Taio Cruz and Kimberly Wyatt – "Higher"

Waterloo Road consisted of Philip Martin Brown and Rebecca Ryan
Arlene Phillips featured in Ed Byrne's performance

Heat 2 (26 February)
Panellists: Jack Whitehall, Lee Mack and Keith Lemon
Performances:
Cee-Lo Green – "Bright Lights, Bigger City"
McFly – "That's The Truth"

Heat 3 (5 March)
Panellists: Jo Brand, John Bishop and Felix Dexter
Performances:
The Wanted – "Gold Forever"
Jessie J – "Price Tag"

The 80s Supergroup consisted of Chesney Hawkes, Clare Grogan, Toyah Willcox and Limahl
Rik Mayall reunited with Edmondson during his routine

Final (12 March)
Panellists: Rufus Hound, Miranda Hart, and Louie Spence
Performances:
Plan B – "Writing's on the Wall"
Nicole Scherzinger – "Don't Hold Your Breath"

Noel Fielding's Mighty Boosh comedy partner Julian Barratt appeared at the end of his performance as Heathcliff.

Series 4 (2012)
On 10 December 2011 it was confirmed the show was returning for another series. Steve Jones and Alex Jones continued to host the show which ran for 5 episodes from 18 February until 17 March 2012.

Heat 1 (18 February)
Panellists: Greg Davies, Keith Lemon and Graham Norton
Performances:
Jessie J – "Domino"
JLS – "Do You Feel What I Feel?"

Heat 2 (25 February)
Panellists: Rufus Hound, Vic Reeves and Iain Lee
Performances:
Ed Sheeran – "Drunk"
Alexandra Burke – "Elephant"

Heat 3 (3 March)
Panellists: Katy Brand, Tim Minchin and Ed Byrne
Performances:
Chris Isaak – "Great Balls of Fire"
Tinchy Stryder feat. Pixie Lott –  "Bright Lights (Good Life)"

David Hasselhoff featured in Mills and Murs' performance.

Heat 4 (10 March)
Panellists: Russell Kane, Jo Brand and Lee Nelson
Performances:
Will Young – "Losing Myself"
LMFAO – "Sorry for Party Rocking"/"Sexy and I Know It"

 Louie Spence featured at the end of Monahan's performance.

Final (17 March)
Panellists: Frank Skinner, Arlene Phillips and Rhod Gilbert
Performances:
Katy Perry – "Part of Me"
JLS – "Proud"

Series 5 (2013)
In 2013, the series reverted to three heats with six acts in the final. It ran from 16 February to 9 March.

Heat 1 (16 February)
Panellists: Mel Giedroyc, Bradley Walsh and Tameka Empson
 Performances:
 Kimberley Walsh — "Defying Gravity"
 The Script — "If You Could See Me Now"

The Soap Stars consisted of Natalie Cassidy, Dean Gaffney, Claire Sweeney and Ricky Groves.
Destiny's Dad consisted of Hal Cruttenden, Shaun Keaveny and Mark Dolan.

Heat 2 (23 February)
Panellists: Lisa Riley, Jason Manford and Paloma Faith
Performances:
 Paloma Faith — "Black and Blue"
 The cast of A Chorus Line — "One"

Waterloo Road consisted of Victoria Bush, Tommy Knight, Carl Au, Rebecca Craven and Marlene Madenge.

Heat 3 (2 March)
Panellists: Arlene Phillips, Greg James and Lee Mack
Performances:
 Nicole Scherzinger — "Boomerang"
 Justin Bieber — "All Around the World"

 Boyzone's singer Keith Duffy was meant to participate in this episode but was unable to compete due to private matters. Jodie Prenger then took his place on the show. 
 Twist and Pulse featured in Lee Nelson's routine.

Final (9 March)
Panellists: Frank Skinner, Jo Brand and Greg Davies
Performances:
Taylor Swift — "22"
Bruno Mars — "When I Was Your Man"

Series 6 (2017)
The sixth series, renamed Let's Sing and Dance for Comic Relief, was hosted by former The Great British Bake Off presenting duo Mel Giedroyc and Sue Perkins.

The full episode line-ups were revealed on 28 February.

Heat 1 (4 March)
Panellists: Katherine Ryan, Jo Brand & Frank Skinner 
Performances: Calum Scott ("Rhythm Inside") and Emeli Sandé ("Shakes")

Paul O'Grady was due to appear as a judge, but was forced to withdraw due to "personal reasons" and was replaced by Katherine Ryan

Heat 2 (11 March)
Panellists: Claudia Winkleman, Adil Ray as Mr Khan and Russell Kane
Performances: Louisa Johnson ("Best Behaviour") and Stepping Out

 Boys Allowed consists of Ben Ofoedu, Duncan James, Gareth Gates, Jon Lee and Ritchie Neville.
 Cast of Casualty and Holby City consists of Amanda Henderson, Chizzy Akudolu and Tony Marshall. 
 The Chasers consists of Anne Hegerty, Jenny Ryan, Mark Labbett and Shaun Wallace.

Heat 3 (18 March)
Panellists: Miranda Hart, Jennifer Saunders, Julian Clary and Tameka Empson
Performances: Anne-Marie ("Ciao Adios")

 The One Show consists of Alex Riley, Angellica Bell, Dominic Littlewood, Iwan Thomas and Michelle Ackerley.

Final (25 March)
Panellists: Rufus Hound, Katy Brand and Jason Manford
Performances: Zara Larsson ("So Good") and Dua Lipa ("Be the One")

Ratings

Series 1

Series 2

Series 3

Series 4

Series 5

Series 6

 Overnight figure.

References

External links
Let's Sing and Dance for Comic Relief
Let's Dance for Comic Relief
Let's Dance for Sport Relief

2009 British television series debuts
2017 British television series endings
BBC Television shows
Charity events in the United Kingdom
Comic Relief
English-language television shows
Sport Relief
British television series revived after cancellation
Television shows shot at BBC Elstree Centre